Nikao Sokattak F.C. is a Cook Islands football club located in Nikao, Rarotonga, Cook Islands. It currently plays in Cook Islands Round Cup, the top level of football in the Cook Islands.

Titles

Cook Islands Round Cup:
Winners (7): 2000, 2004, 2005, 2006, 2008, 2009 , 2021.
Runner-up (5): 2010, 2011, 2017, 2018, 2019

Cook Islands Cup:
Winners (12): 1983, 2002, 2003, 2005, 2007, 2008, 2010, 2011 , 2012 , 2020, 2021 , 2022.
Runner-up (8): 1999, 2000, 2004, 2006, 2009, 2015, 2018, 2019.

Current squad
As of 5 August 2022. Squad registered to play in the 2022 OFC Champions League.

References

Football clubs in the Cook Islands